María José Sáenz de Buruaga Gómez (born 4 June 1968) is a Spanish politician from the People's Party (PP), president of the party's regional branch since 25 March 2017 who served as Vice President of Cantabria and Regional Minister of Health and Social Services from 2011 to 2015.

References

1968 births
Politicians from Cantabria
People's Party (Spain) politicians
Living people